Cumberland was an electoral district in the Northwest Territories from 1891–1894, the riding was in the rural area to the northeast of Prince Albert, Saskatchewan.  Cumberland disappeared in 1894 when it merged with the newly created Prince Albert East.

A new incarnation of the cumberland district has existed in Saskatchewan from 1912 to present.

Election results 1891

External links 

Former electoral districts of Northwest Territories